Orbital fissure may refer to:

 Inferior orbital fissure
 Superior orbital fissure